That's What is an album by the American steel-string guitar artist Leo Kottke. It is distinctive in its jazzy nature and "talking" songs ("Buzzby" and "Husbandry"). It reached No. 24 on [[Billboard charts|Billboard'''s]] Top New Age Albums charts, Kottke's highest charting position on Billboard.

The song "Little Snoozer" is played on a Charvel demo model of a Danelectro 6-string bass guitar tuned one octave lower than a standard 6-string guitar. Kottke used trombones on many of the songs.

Kottke has re-recorded at least two more versions of "Jesus Maria".

Critical reception

The Orlando Sentinel wrote that "Kottke's eccentric poetics and monotone Lou Reed-style of delivery make 'Buzzby' and 'Husbandry' the strangest moments on That's What." The Chicago Tribune'' deemed the album "a rumbling, comic, folksy sound, yet one that remains strangely comfortable and comforting."

AllMusic stated: "Leo Kottke has always been a highly idiosyncratic guitar player whose music is infused with his wry sense of humor. That's What is no exception, with Kottke's guitar work drawing from jazzy, blues and folk sources... Tying it all together is Kottke's fine guitar playing, as nimble and as quirky as ever."

Track listing
All songs by Leo Kottke except as noted.
 "Little Snoozer" – 3:53
 "Buzzby" – 3:57
 "What the Arm Said" – 2:54
 "Creature Feature" – 4:14
 "Oddball" – 2:51
 "Czech Bounce" – 3:38
 "Mid-Air" (Willard O. Peterson) – 3:23
 "The Great One" – 3:22
 "Husbandry" – 4:52
 "Jesus Maria" (Carla Bley) – 4:30

Personnel
Leo Kottke - guitar
Billy Peterson - string bass, 5-string electric bass, drums, piano, synth, Farfisa Professional
Bruce Paulson - tenor & bass trombones
Gordy Knudtson - percussion

Production notes
Produced by Willard O. Peterson & Leo Kottke
Engineered by Paul Martinson
Assistant engineers: Scott Bartel & Sam Hudson
Mastered by Doug Sax
Arrangements by Willard O. Peterson except guitar on "Jesus Maria" arranged by Tim Sparks

References

External links
 Leo Kottke official site
 Unofficial Leo Kottke web site (fan site)

Leo Kottke albums
1990 albums
Private Music albums